Alper Potuk (born 8 April 1991) is a Turkish footballer who plays as a midfielder or winger for TFF First League club Çaykur Rizespor.

Early life
Potuk was born in Bolvadin, Afyonkarahisar Province, on 8 April 1991. He began playing football with friends in the street, receiving a strong backing from his family, especially his father and brother; his brother would give him a ride to watch Afyonkarahisarspor training sessions. Potuk's family relocated to Eskişehir because of his father's job.

Career

Eskişehirspor
Çiftelerspor signed the youngster in 2002, and he competed in their youth teams for three years. In a match against Eskişehirspor, Potuk scored his team's lone goal in a 1–4 loss, impressing the Eskişehirspor coaches. Potuk started his career in the city of Eskişehir, joining Çiftelerspor in 2002, before moving on to Eskişehirspor in 2005. He made his professional debut on 29 May 2009 against Gaziantepspor. In the second qualifying round of the 2012–13 UEFA Europa League, he scored the first goal in a 2–0 win against Scottish Premier League side St Johnstone.

Fenerbahçe
On 22 May 2013, Alper completed a move to Fenerbahçe in five-year contract. The transfer involved Henri Bienvenu moving in the opposite direction, to Eskişehirspor, while Fenerbahçe also paid €6.25 million. According to the reports, a journalist interviewed with Alper in National Team Camp and He talked about his transfer rumor. He promised to Fenerbahçe for transfer. "Before the negotiate contract Fenerbahçe's Boss Aziz Yıldırım called me and they wanted to see me at Fenerbahçe. Also they will transfer great names and Fenerbahçe's squad will be more greater" said Alper. In addition to his conversation he said he is a fan of Fenerbahçe and if Fenerbahçe's managers will deal with Eskişehirspor, he will sign to Fenerbahçe. Then transfer completed after that. I promised only Fenerbahçe. So I dealt with Fenerbahçe 15 days ago." On 31 August 2013, he scored his debut goal for the club in a Süper Lig match against Sivasspor.

International career

Potuk represented his country's U19, U20, and  U21 teams. He played his first match for Turkey in a friendly game against Slovakia at Bursa Atatürk Stadium on 29 February 2012. He subsequently represented Turkey in 2014 World Cup qualifying, playing his first qualifier against Andorra on 22 March 2013.

Career statistics

Club

International

Scores and results table. Turkey's goal tally first:

Honours
Fenerbahçe
Süper Lig: 2013–14
Turkish Super Cup: 2014

References

External links
 
 
 
 
 

1991 births
Living people
People from Bolvadin
Association football midfielders
Association football wingers
Turkish footballers
Turkey international footballers
Turkey under-21 international footballers
Turkey youth international footballers
Eskişehirspor footballers
Fenerbahçe S.K. footballers
MKE Ankaragücü footballers
Süper Lig players
Turkey B international footballers
Çaykur Rizespor footballers